Kopsanone is an alkaloid isolated from Aspidosperma.

References

Extra reading

Alkaloids found in Apocynaceae
Indolizidines
Tryptamine alkaloids